There are a variety of articles listing sportspeople of a particular sport.

Archers
Baseball players (Major League Baseball)
Basketball players
Basketball players (Men's National Basketball Association)
Basketball players (Women's National Basketball Association)
Beach volleyball players
Bellator MMA fighters
Boxers
Female boxers
Male boxers
Bullfighters
Cricketers
Curlers
Cyclists
Dancers
Divers
Disc golf
Fencers
Figure skaters
Football games
American football players
Association football players
Gaelic footballers
Golfers
Female golfers
Male golfers
Grand Prix motorcycle racers
Gymnasts
 Heptathletes
Ice hockey players (National Hockey League)
Jockeys
Kickboxers
Female kickboxers
Male kickboxers
Judoka
Marathon runners
Martial artists
Mixed martial arts
Female mixed martial artists
Male mixed martial artists
Motocross riders
Orienteers
Polo players
Pro skaters
Race walkers
Roller skaters
Rowers
Rugby union players
Skiers
Speed skaters
Sporting knights and dames
Sprinters
Squash players
Surfers
Swimmers
Synchronised swimmers
Table tennis players
Track and field athletes
Hammer throwers
Javelin throwers
Male hurdlers
Marathoners
Long-distance runners
Middle-distance runners
Sprinters
 Racing drivers
Triathletes
Tennis players
Female tennis players
Male singles tennis players
Male doubles tennis players
UFC fighters
Ultimate disc players
Volleyball players
Water polo players
Wrestlers
 Amateur wrestlers
 Professional wrestlers

See also

 List of sports
 List of sportswomen
 List of people by occupation
 List of sports announcers
 List of television reporters
 Sportsmanship